Jayson Jordan Mena Gutiérrez (born 13 March 1992) is a Chilean footballer. His last club was Provincial Osorno.

Honours

Player
Universidad de Concepción
 Primera B (1): 2013

Deportes Puerto Montt
 Segunda División Profesional (1): 2014–15

References
 
 

1992 births
Living people
Chilean footballers
Universidad de Concepción footballers
Chilean Primera División players
Sportspeople from Concepción, Chile
Association football midfielders
21st-century Chilean people